Paul-Émile Boutigny (10 March 1853 in Paris – 27 June 1929 in Paris) was a French painter who specialized in military subjects.

Life and work
His father was a tailor and his mother worked as a seamstress. Following the Franco-Prussian War, he studied at the École des Beaux-Arts under Alexandre Cabanel and developed a unique style of battle painting, drawn from personal experience. He was a regular participant in the Salon after 1880.

He was decorated with the Légion d'honneur in 1898. That same year, he began producing the satirical, artistic and literary journal Cocorico, which promoted Art Nouveau.

He illustrated several works:
 Chants du Soldat, a popular collection of patriotic poems by Paul Déroulède. Calmann Lévy, Paris 1881
 Boule de Suif by Guy de Maupassant, Calmann Lévy, Paris 1899
 L'attaque du Moulin by Émile Zola, from the anthology Les Soirées de Médan,  Collection des Dix, Paris 1901

Some of his most familiar paintings include:
 An Episode from the Quiberon Affair (1881). Musée des Beaux-Arts et Arts Décoratifs de Mirande
 The Seventh Line to Attack Malakoff and the Death of Captain Pagès (1887). Hall of Honor of the Seventh Infantry Regiment.
 Napoléon – The Battle of Aspern-Essling – Death of Jean Lannes, Marshall of the Empire (1894)
 Napoléon Bonaparte – The Revolt at Pavia (1895)

References

Further reading
 Emmanuel Bénézit: Dictionnaire critique et documentaire des peintres, sculpteurs, dessinateurs et graveurs de tous les temps et de tous les pays, Vol. 2. Gründ, Paris 1999, .

External links

 Antiquarian Traders: The Revolt at Pavia, with commentary.
 ArtNet: More works by Boutigny
  Liste Cocorico Dates of issues and cover illustrations.

1853 births
1929 deaths
Military art
19th-century French painters
French male painters
20th-century French painters
20th-century French male artists
French magazine founders
19th-century French male artists